Leonard is both a masculine given name and a surname.

Leonard may also refer to:


Places in the United States
 Leonard, Michigan
 Leonard, Minnesota
 Leonard, Missouri
 Leonard, North Dakota
 Leonard, Oklahoma
 Leonard, Texas

Other uses
 Leonardo (journal), published by the MIT Press 
 Léonard (comics), a Belgian comic series
 Leonard (demon), in the Dictionnaire Infernal
 Leonard Part 6, a 1987 American spy parody film
 Leonard Medal, honors outstanding contributions to the science of meteoritics
 Leonard (appliances), in Michigan, U.S.
 "Leonard" (song), a 1981 song by American country music artist Merle Haggard from his album Back to the Barrooms
 "Leonard", standard author abbreviation for Emery Clarence Leonard in botanical works

See also 
 Leonards (disambiguation)
 Saint Leonard (disambiguation)
 St Leonards (disambiguation)
 Lenny (disambiguation)
 Leonardo (disambiguation)